Gimsøy or Gimsøya may refer to:

Places
Gimsøy, or Gimsøysand, a village in Vågan municipality in Nordland county, Norway 
Gimsøy (municipality), a former municipality in Nordland county, Norway
Gimsøya, an island and village area in Vågan municipality in Nordland county, Norway
Gimsøy Church, a church in Vågan municipality in Nordland county, Norway
Gimsøy Bridge, a bridge in Vågan municipality in Nordland county, Norway
Gimsøy Abbey, a historic abbey in Skien municipality in Telemark county, Norway
Gimsøy, Telemark, a village in Skien municipality in Telemark county, Norway
Gimsøy Church (Telemark), a church in Skien municipality in Telemark county, Norway